The 1963 Baltimore mayoral election saw the former mayor and governor Theodore McKeldin return to office for a second non-consecutive term as mayor by defeating incumbent mayor Philip H. Goodman.

To date, this is the last time a Republican won a mayoral election in Baltimore. It is also the last time a Republican managed even 30% of the city's vote.

Nominations
Primary elections were held March 5.

Democratic primary
Among those challenging for the Democratic nomination Goodman were Comptroller R. Walter Graham, Jr. and City Council President Leon Abramson.

Republican primary

General election
The general election was held May 7.

References

Baltimore mayoral
Mayoral elections in Baltimore
Baltimore